You Belong There is the debut studio album by American singer-songwriter Daniel Rossen, released on April 8, 2022, by Warp Records. The album was announced on January 20, 2022 and was supported by two singles.

Track listing

Charts

References

2022 debut albums